The 2002 Women's Hockey Champions Trophy was the 10th edition of the Hockey Champions Trophy for women. It was held from 24 August to 1 September 2002 in Macau, China, being this the first time that the annual six-nation tournament was staged in that country.

China won the tournament for the first time after defeating Argentina 3–1 in the final on penalty strokes after a 2–2 draw.

Teams
The participating teams were determined by International Hockey Federation (FIH):

 (Defending champions)
 (Champions of 2000 Summer Olympics and 1998 World Cup)
  
 (Third in 2000 Summer Olympics)
 (Sixth in 2000 Summer Olympics)
 (Eighth in 2000 Summer Olympics)

Squads

Head Coach: Sergio Vigil

Head Coach: David Bell

Head Coach: Kim Chang-back

Head Coach: Tricia Heberle

Head Coach: Marc Lammers

Head Coach: Jan Borren

Umpires
Below are the 9 umpires appointed by the International Hockey Federation:

Chieko Akiyama (JPN)
Renée Cohen (NED)
Ute Conen (GER)
Marelize de Klerk (RSA)
Jean Duncan (SCO)
Yao Hongjun (CHN)
Jane Nockolds (ENG)
Minka Woolley (AUS)
Xiong Ru (CHN)

Results
All times are China Standard Time (UTC+08:00)

Pool

Classification

Fifth and sixth place

Third and fourth place

Final

Awards

Statistics

Final standings

Goalscorers

References

External links
Official FIH website

Women's Hockey Champions Trophy
Champions Trophy
Hockey Champions Trophy
International women's field hockey competitions hosted by China
Women's sport in Macau
Hockey Champions Trophy
International sports competitions hosted by Macau
Hockey Champions Trophy
Hockey Champions Trophy